Charlotte W. Pratt is an American biochemist and author. She is the co-author with Judith G. Voet and Donald Voet of the popular standard biochemistry textbook Fundamentals of Biochemistry.

As of 2016, she is an associate professor of biochemistry at Seattle Pacific University. She has also written the textbook Essential Biochemistry.

Dr. Pratt attended the University of Notre Dame for her undergraduate degree and graduated with a Ph.D. from Duke University.

References

Living people
Duke University alumni
American women biochemists
University of Notre Dame alumni
Seattle Pacific University faculty
American science writers
American women academics
21st-century American women
Year of birth missing (living people)